Ripley's Believe It or Not!, an American documentary television series which was hosted by Jack Palance and aired on ABC from 1982 to 1986 and is the second television version of Ripley's Believe It or Not!. Based on the travels and discoveries of oddity-hunter Ripley, this show looked at the people, places and events that made up the stranger side of human history. Subjects have included Nikola Tesla, The Bermuda Triangle, The Elephant Man, and Mad King Ludwig. The series featured Palance or a co-host showcasing strange events, places of odd significance, trivia, and a commercial bumper (broadcasting) of original art from Ripley's comics. In a few cases, such as the assassination of Rasputin, Palance reenacted the event in period costume and a stage set. Henry Mancini and His Orchestra provided the theme song.

The series was predated by two 1981 specials hosted by Palance on May 3, 1981 (directed by Ronald Lyon) and November 6, 1981.

Co-hosts included actress Catherine Shirriff in season 1, Palance's daughter Holly Palance in seasons 2 and 3 and singer Marie Osmond, in season 4.

Episodes

Specials

Season 1
Total number of episodes: 20.

Season 2
Total number of episodes: 23.

Season 3
Total number of episodes: 21.

Season 4
Total number of episodes: 11.

References

External links
 

Ripley's Believe It or Not! television series
American non-fiction television series
Television series by Sony Pictures Television
1980s American television series
1982 American television series debuts
1986 American television series endings
American Broadcasting Company original programming